Martha Appiah (born 19 December 1965) is a Ghanaian sprinter. She competed in the women's 4 × 100 metres relay at the 1987 Summer Olympics which took place in Stadio Olimpico, Rome. She took part in 4 x 400 metres relay in 1984 which took place at the Memorial Coliseum in Los Angeles.

References

External links
 

1965 births
Living people
Athletes (track and field) at the 1984 Summer Olympics
Athletes (track and field) at the 1988 Summer Olympics
Ghanaian female sprinters
Olympic athletes of Ghana
Place of birth missing (living people)
Olympic female sprinters